is a Japanese light novel series by Kazuma Ōtorino, with illustrations by Akaringo and Non. Enterbrain has published twelve volumes since January 2012 under their Famitsu Bunko imprint. A spin-off light novel series titled  is also published under Famitsu Bunko, with the first volume released on August 30, 2013. A manga adaptation by Hitoshi Okuda began serialization in Enterbrain's Famitsu Comic Clear web magazine in August 2012. An anime television series adaptation by A-1 Pictures began airing from April 10, 2014, on Fuji TV's noitamina block.

In July 2014 Nozomi Ōsaka, under penname Non, replaces Akaringo as illustrator for the original light novel and its spin-off due to Akaringo's health condition. Akaringo stated that his health declined, and which is why the illustration for seventh volume could not be finished. Due to this, the decision was made to replace the illustrator in both projects.

Plot
On the "Special Student Zone" artificial island – Nanaejima, the story centers on a beautiful, optimistic, but NEET (not in education, employment or training) girl Nanana Ryūgajō, who was mysteriously killed in her own apartment.

Ten years later, a boy named Juugo Yama was forced to transfer to a high school on the island. With only a certain amount of money to live on, Juugo chooses a low-rent apartment that happens to be haunted by the ghostly Nanana, who is bound to her former home and unable to move on. Juugo and members of the school's adventure club join a "treasure hunt royale" on the island for the Nanana Collection, treasures that possess mysterious powers.

Characters

Main characters
 

An energetic student in his second year of high school with strong stamina and endurance as well as a fondness for girls in maid outfits. He is devoted to helping Nanana move on, in spite of her constant commotion in his room, as he tries to find interest in her. Jūgo joins the school's Adventure Club on a hunt for the island's Nanana Collection. It is revealed he's secretly the heir of Matsuri, an ancient "noble" thief organization that claims to only steal from the wicked, but was banished to Nanae Island when he refused to take the position due to a difference in ideals. Jūgo claims he does not believe in doing things for others, and does not believe he'd give everything to help anyone. Despite refusing to take the position, Jūgo is actually quite good at stealing treasures, and managed to outmatch Tensai, Isshin, and even other Matsuri members a few times, although Tensai usually deduces it in the end. Jūgo's Nanana Collection is a large jewel that allows its user to tell when others lie when looking through it, which originally belongs to Ikkaku, but Jūgo intercepted it when Matsuri members attempted to steal it, and gave them a fake one later.
 

A ghost bound to Juugo's room since her assassination 10 years ago. Unable to leave the room, Nanana spends all her time playing video and online games, and eating her favorite and only food – pudding. Though she never appears bored with her lifestyle, in reality she is lonely until Jūgo rents the room. When she was alive, Nanana was an extremely famous adventurer on the island, part of the group called Great 7, discovering great treasures with mysterious powers all around the world. Her remaining treasures and property become the islands' greatest secret following her death. As an adventurer, Nanana knows all of her treasures' hidden locations, the traps protecting them, and their functions, but refuses to reveal their secrets, considering the secrets and risk a part of the precious experience. The treasure is referred as Nanana's Buried Treasure and the artifacts with hidden magical powers are referred as the Nanana Collection, and have been scattered across the island by an unknown party known as "Leprechaun".

Juugo's classmate. Tensai is smart and into solving puzzles; she aspires to be a master detective and refers to herself as such. Though smart, she has trouble properly explaining her deductions as her thoughts go too fast for her to fully express them. She moves into the apartment next to Jūgo's and becomes his neighbor. She knows that Jūgo is connected to Matsuri and declares him her rival, and thus frequently follows him and even occasionally wishes that events lead him to criminal activity. It is hinted that she has a crush on Jūgo from their adventures but doesn't want to admit it. Her Nanana Collection is a charm which is rumored to have exorcising ability. Whenever she meets someone, after they give their name she asks for their "real name".

Juugo's classmate and Tensai's assistant. Daruku is a male that gets mistaken for a female, and has a feminine appearance and personality. he generally dresses as a maid, and wears the women's uniform at school. It is hinted that he is attracted to Tensai and he gets upset when people mistake him for a female, he has occasionally been seen to offer Tensai food and then consider using the utensils to taste her saliva. Kagetora finds him attractive and they spend some time together.

Adventure club members

A third-year student and President of the Adventure Club. He's obsessed with obtaining the Nanana's treasures' power. He had betrayed Jūgo and Tensai twice for Nanana's treasure, but failed in the end both times. He is known to be popular with girls. His Nanana Collection is a teapot that can make tea without tea leaves, and a pair of glasses that can copy other people's knowledge and abilities. He also had a magical staff that can grant wishes that he received by betraying Jūgo and Tensai, but was forcefully bought off by Ikkaku later.

The strict vice-president of the Adventure Club. She is loyal to Isshin, and will become angry whenever anyone speak ill of him.

A club member who masters in reconnaissance. He has the ability for high agility, seen when used as a bodyguard.

One of the former residents of Nanana's room. Juugo finds a hidden manual that Kasumi left behind instructing him how to deal with Nanana. It is said Kasumi is one of the founders of the Adventure Club.

Vice-president of the first generation Adventure Club. He serves as the main antagonist of the story, believes might makes right, and will threaten, use brute force, and sacrifice others to get what he wants. The first generation of Adventure club was almost disbanded when he used a female member as sacrifice in order to get a Nanana Collection, causing her to become physically crippled, and left the club with the collection. He came into conflict with the present Adventure club when he threatens Saki as she knows the clue about the treasure; the club fought him inside the treasure room. While he held off the group and fled, he was later intercepted by Matsuri members, under Jūgo's command. His Nanana Collections are a bell that can summon cloud and rain, a pair of shoes that allows the user to dive into shadows as if swimming, and a ring that allows the user to give strong mental suggestions to others. He is also the previous resident of Nanana's room, but was kicked out as he rarely stayed, did not pay the rent, and often left Nanana alone.

Matsuri
Jūgo's Father

The 13th leader of Matsuri, he banished Jūgo from the organization when the latter refuses to succeed his position. He is also collecting Nanana's treasure, which he declares that he is using them to conquer the world, although Jūgo consider him joking due to his personality.

A college girl, Yukihime is secretly a high-ranked member of Matsuri, and is the teacher of Jūgo's martial arts. She holds a grudge toward Jūgo for leaving Matsuri and is persistent in bringing him back. Jūgo later gave her a Nanana Collection, a pen that can shoot out chains to pin down the target to prevent his escape. She seems to hold feelings for Jūgo.

A young member under Yukihime's command who is a master of disguise known as Hundred-Faces.

Great 7

The administrator of the islands.

The landlady of the apartment that Juugo currently lives in. Shiki is Nanana's best friend from when she was still human, and they used to go on explorations on the island with the Great 7 group. She hopes Juugo could properly help Nanana cheer up and keep her company. However, Shiki does tend to drink alcohol a lot.

Three Skulls

Leader of the Three Skulls, the head of Nanae-jima underground. She was a member of Great 7, but was banished. Her Nanana Collection includes an eye patch that allows her to see from nearby people's eyesight, an arrow which can point to an item's location for the user, and a large white tiger.

A member of Three Skulls and Juugo's classmate. "Tetsu" carries a real Japanese sword and wields it proficiently. He is fervently devoted to protecting Saki, and will do anything and fight anyone for her sake, though he denies any romantic involvement.

A member of Three Skulls and a first year at Juugo's school. Kurosu nicknamed her "Yun" because she "looks like a 'Yun'". She suffers from a minor case of androphobia, though she is generally able to accept men once she knows them. She took a job request by Ikusaba to enter a particular ruin and retrieve the treasure inside, but failed and was severely injured. During this time she was missing for several days, and when she returned she did not remember anything about what had happened.

Others

Juugo's classmate. Yurika is aspired to become a novelist, and she seems to have interest in Juugo.

Media

Anime
An anime television series adaptation by A-1 Pictures began airing from April 10, 2014, on Fuji TV's noitamina block. The opening theme for the series was "Butterfly Effect" performed by Shiritsu Ebisu Chugaku and the ending theme is "Kasukana Hisokana Tashikana Mirai" (微かな密かな確かなミライ, lit. "A Hazy, Secret, Certain Future"), performed by the voice acting unit Sphere. The anime has been licensed for streaming by Aniplex of America.

Before the first light novel volume was published in January 2012, Enterbrain streamed a promotional video on December 26, 2011, with animation by A-1 Pictures, after the novel won the top prize at the 13th Enterbrain Entertainment Awards in September 2011.

Episode list

Reception
Theron Martin of Anime News Network published a positive review of the complete anime series, giving it an overall B+ rating. Despite the story being told halfway through and some inconsistency in the animation, Martin praised the diverse and dramatically intriguing ensemble cast, Kanta Kamei's overall direction and the artistic architecture throughout Nanae Island, saying the episodes "find a good balance between humor, action, character development, and the occasional more serious overtones, all while keeping the decided silliness factor surprisingly well under control." Stig Høgset from THEM Anime Reviews also gave praise to the main cast for being likable and having intelligence, and the "generally appealing" production of its action scenes, character artwork and animation being fluid but felt disappointed with the various secrets and treasures that encompass the worldbuilding of Nanae Island, concluding with, "Kind of incomplete and somewhat underwhelming for all its ambitions, Nanana's Buried Treasure is still a fun show to watch."

References

External links
Anime official website 

2012 Japanese novels
2013 Japanese novels
A-1 Pictures
Anime and manga based on light novels
Enterbrain manga
Famitsu Bunko
Japanese webcomics
Kadokawa Dwango franchises
Light novels
Noitamina
Shōnen manga
Supernatural anime and manga
Webcomics in print